The 1975–76 Winnipeg Jets season was the Jets' fourth season of operation in the World Hockey Association (WHA). After qualifying first in the Canadian Division, the Jets then proceeded to win three rounds of the playoffs to win their first Avco Cup, sweeping the Houston Aeros 4–0 in the final.

Offseason

Regular season

Final standings

Schedule and results

Playoffs

Winnipeg Jets 4, Edmonton Oilers 0

Winnipeg Jets 4, Calgary Cowboys 1

Winnipeg Jets 4, Houston Aeros 0 – Avco Cup Finals

Player statistics

Regular season
Scoring

Goaltending

Playoffs
Scoring

Goaltending

Awards and records

Transactions

Draft picks
Winnipeg's draft picks at the 1975 WHA Amateur Draft.

Farm teams

See also
1975–76 WHA season

References

External links

Winnipeg Jets (1972–1996) seasons
Winn
Winn